Keith Lamb may refer to:

 Keith Lamb (executive) (born 1946), former chief executive at Middlesbrough F.C
 Keith Lamb (musician) (born 1952), lead singer and founding member of the Australian band Hush

See also
Keith Lam (born 1940), Hong Kong real estate investor and politician